Da Jacob Gyang Buba CFR (born October 10, 1951) is a retired Nigeria customs officer and elder statesman. He served as the Comptroller-General of Nigeria Customs Service from 2004 to 2008. On April 1, 2009, he was sworn as the Gbong Gwom, the paramount traditional ruler of the Berom Kingdom becoming the 5th Gbong Gwom after the demise of Da Victor Dung Pam. He is the Chairman, Jos Traditional Council of Chiefs and president of the Jos Joint Traditional Council. He currently serves as the 3rd Chancellor of the Nnamdi Azikiwe University since March 2016 at the 10th convocation of the institution.

Background 
Gyang Buba was born on October 10, 1951 in Madu Village of Du District, Jos South, Plateau State. He is the first son of Buba Dung Bot of the Lo Du, Lo-Wet family and Ngo Kaneng Buba, one among the ruling house of the kingdom.
He began his early education at SUM elementary school Chwelnyap in 1960 to 1963  then went to Baptist Day School Jos to complete his elementary studies. After finishing, He attended from 1966 to 1971, and graduated from the Provincial Secondary School, Kuru now known as Government Secondary School Kuru and afterwards attended the Institute of Administration in Ahmadu Bello University and graduated with a Diploma in Banking in 1975.

Career 
He started work as a clerk at the Federal Pay Office in 1972 to 1974 before attending the Institute of Administration and enrolled in the Nigeria Customs Service in 1975 as the assistant preventive officer. He became CG in 2004 and together was the chairman of the African Union Sub-committee of directors general of Customs during the 2007 to 2008, the last post held was the deputy CG of customs at the Abuja's headquarter.
As the CG of customs, he implemented the adaptation of the Common External Tariffs for ECOWAS and operations of scanners in borders, areas of airports and port, he amends the holistic review of the Customs and Excise Management Act 1958 and various customs notice. Gyang attends various Trades conferences of which amongst includes the INTERPOL seminars. He is an ordained member of the Seventh Day Adventist Church, and has been awarded the national honors of Commander of the Order of the Niger (CON) and the Officer of the Federal Republic (OFR), he was also a member in the 2014 National Conference.

Awards 
In October 2022, a Nigerian national honor of Commander Of The Order Of The Fedral Republic (CFR) was conferred on him by President Muhammadu Buhari.

References

Further reading

External links 

 
 
 
 
 
 
 
 

1951 births
Living people
Nigerian traditional rulers
Nigerian government officials
Officers of the Order of the Niger
Commanders of the Order of the Niger
Nigerian customs service officer
Nigerian customs service personnel